Every Single Day is a collaboration album between rappers Luni Coleone and Cool Nutz, released on June 5, 2007.

Track listing
"Every Single Day" (featuring Von OP) 5:34
"Go" 4:18
"Chippers" (featuring Rocafella) 3:52
"What It Do?" 4:06
"Skirt" (featuring Key Loom & Rocafella) 4:03
"There Go!" 4:07
"That Doe" (featuring Bosko) 4:27
"Like a Boss" (featuring Slim Weez) 3:46
"Go Dumb" (featuring Key Loom & E-Dawg) 4:20
"Ignant" (featuring Maniac Loc) 3:42
"Cop a Room" 3:59
"Come Get It" (featuring J. Townsend) 3:40
"Y'all Don't Know" (featuring Mr. D.O.G.) 3:56
"What" (featuring Maniac Loc) 4:41
"Luv for Slugs" 3:55

References

2007 albums
Luni Coleone albums
Cool Nutz albums
Collaborative albums
Albums produced by Bosko
Gangsta rap albums by American artists